Design Museum Holon is the first museum in Israel dedicated to design. The building of the museum was planned and designed by Israeli architect and  industrial designer Ron Arad in cooperation with Bruno Asa. The museum is in the eastern part of the new culture area of Holon that includes the Médiathèque (central library, theater, cinémathèque). Nearby is the faculty of design in the Holon Institute of Technology.

The museum opened on 3 March 2010. That is the first building that was planned by Ron Arad.

The museum was noted by travel magazine Conde Nast Traveler as one of the new world wonders.

See also
Visual arts in Israel
Architecture of Israel

References

External links 
 Design Museum Holon
 Aharon Feiner Eden Materials Library, Design Museum Holon

Art museums established in 2010
Design museums
Art museums and galleries in Israel
2010 establishments in Israel
Museums in Tel Aviv District
Holon